Shingo Kunieda and Satoshi Saida defeated the defending champions Michaël Jeremiasz and Jayant Mistry in the final, 7–5, 6–2 to win the gentlemen's doubles wheelchair tennis title at the 2006 Wimbledon Championships.

Seeds

  Shingo Kunieda /  Satoshi Saida (champions)
  Robin Ammerlaan /  Martin Legner (semifinals, third place)

Draw

Finals

References

External links

Men's Wheelchair Doubles
Wimbledon Championship by year – Wheelchair men's doubles